The 1936 Louisiana Tech Bulldogs football team was an American football team that represented the Louisiana Polytechnic Institute (now known as Louisiana Tech University) as a member of the Southern Intercollegiate Athletic Association during the 1936 college football season. In their third year under head coach Eddie McLane, the team compiled a 6–2–1 record.

Schedule

References

Louisiana Tech
Louisiana Tech Bulldogs football seasons
Louisiana Tech Bulldogs football